Yoo Chang-soon (6 August 1918 – 2 June 2010) was the Prime Minister of South Korea from 4 January 1982 to 24 June 1982.
 Yoo was born in Anju, South Pyongan, a city located in present-day North Korea, and attended the Pyongyang Commercial School (평양상업학교). He went on to tertiary education at Hastings College in Nebraska, graduating in 1950. The following year, he entered the service of the South Korean government, working at the Bank of Korea's Tokyo branch. He was governor of the Bank of Korea from 1961 to 1962.

References

1918 births
2010 deaths
Hastings College alumni
Prime Ministers of South Korea
People from South Pyongan
South Korean expatriates in the United States
Governors of the Bank of Korea